Tapinoma muelleri is a species of ant in the genus Tapinoma. Described by Karavaiev in 1926, the species is endemic to Indonesia.

References

Tapinoma
Hymenoptera of Asia
Insects of Indonesia
Insects described in 1926